State Highway 218 (SH 218), also known as Pat Booker Road, is a short state highway in the U.S. state of Texas, connecting Interstate 35 to Randolph Air Force Base at Farm to Market Road 78. The highway is located in Greater San Antonio, and connects the cities of Live Oak and Universal City.

History
SH 218 has existed in its current alignment since June 11, 1935 to serve as an access road to Randolph Air Force Base from U.S. Highway 81 (now I-35).

Route description
SH 218 splits from I-35 just west of the I-35/Loop 1604 interchange in Live Oak and heads towards the east-southeast.  About a half mile from I-35, SH 218 intersects Loop 1604 via a diamond interchange.  The highway continues towards the southeast through Universal City, until it ends at FM 78 at the main gate of Randolph Air Force Base after just .

Junction list

References

218
Transportation in Bexar County, Texas